Cerithidium perparvulum is a species of sea snail, a marine gastropod mollusk in the family Cerithiidae.

Description

Distribution

References

 van Aartsen, J. J. (2006). Indo-Pacific migrants into the Mediterranean. 4. Cerithidium diplax (Watson, 1886) and Cerithidium perparvulum (Watson, 1886) (Gastropoda, Caenogastropoda). Basteria. 70: 33–39.

External links

Cerithiidae
Gastropods described in 1886